is a one-shot Japanese manga written by Yoshino Somei and illustrated by Row Takakura. The manga is licensed in North America by Media Blasters.

Manga
Skyscrapers of Oz written by Yoshino Somei and illustrated by Row Takakura. The manga is licensed in North America by Media Blasters, which released the manga on August 15, 2004. Chara released the manga in Japan in October 2001.

Reception
Eduardo M. Chavez from Mania.com criticises the manga's backgrounds as "pretty stale". Even though it was a "totally random yaoi" it sold twice as much as the Lodoss manga. The manga has been compared to fellow yaoi manga, Fake for its "haphazard chemistry" between the two protagonists.

References

External links

2001 manga
Drama anime and manga
Josei manga
Romance anime and manga
Yaoi anime and manga
Tokuma Shoten manga